The 2016 Alamo Bowl was a postseason college football bowl game, played on December 29, 2016 at the Alamodome in San Antonio, Texas. The game featured the Oklahoma State Cowboys, of the Big 12 Conference, and the Colorado Buffaloes, of the Pac-12 Conference. It was the two teams' first meeting since 2009 and the first since Colorado's departure from the Big 12 Conference in 2011. The game was the 24th edition of the Alamo Bowl and was sponsored by the San Antonio-based company, Valero Energy.

Team selection
The Big 12 and Pac-12 has contractual tie-ins with the Alamo Bowl that afforded the bowl organizing committee the second pick of the conferences' bowl-eligible teams. A Big 12 team has participated in the game every year since the conference's founding in 1996. Previously, Oklahoma State played in the 1997, 2004, and December 2010 editions, and finished with a 1–2 record. Colorado participated in the 2002 edition as a representative as the Big 12, losing to the 2002 Wisconsin Badgers football team.

The Pac 12 and the Alamo Bowl began their partnership in 2010. The Pac 12 has since provided their second pick to the game.

Oklahoma State

Colorado

Series history
The Buffaloes and Cowboys first played each other in 1920, a 40–7 Colorado victory. The teams played each other annually from 1960–97, as members of the Big Eight Conference, and twice every four years in Big 12 competition. The Buffaloes heading into this contest held a 26–19–1 record over Oklahoma State. However, the Cowboys won the two previous matchups including a 31–28 victory over the Buffaloes in 2009.

Game summary

Scoring summary

Source:

Statistics

References

Alamo
Alamo Bowl
2016 Alamo Bowl
2016 Alamo Bowl
December 2016 sports events in the United States
2016 in sports in Texas